The Tablelands Highway is a 375 kilometre single lane sealed road in the Northern Territory, Australia. It runs from Barkly Homestead on the Barkly Highway to Cape Crawford near Borroloola on the Carpentaria Highway.

Upgrades
The Northern Australia Beef Roads Program announced in 2016 included the following project for the Tablelands Highway.

Road upgrading
The project to upgrade selected sections to a two-lane sealed standard was completed in mid 2020 at a total cost of $25 million.

See also

 Highways in Australia
 List of highways in the Northern Territory

References

Highways in Australia
Highways in the Northern Territory